Sydney "Syd" Maurice Lucas (21 September 1900 – 4 November 2008) was, at age 108, one of three remaining British Tommies of World War I (along with Harry Patch and Netherwood Hughes), although the war ended before he was sent to fight.

Early life
He was born in Leicester, England, and conscripted into the British Army's Sherwood Foresters while a teenager in August 1918. He was also, along with his compatriots Claude Choules and Bill Stone, and France's Fernand Goux, one of the four remaining veterans in the world to have served in both World Wars. Like Choules, he lived in Australia, in Rosebud, Victoria, the same state as the last Australian veteran John Campbell Ross.

Military service
Lucas shipped to Australia in 1928. On 13 June 1940, during World War II, he volunteered for the 2nd Australian Imperial Force, enlisting at Caulfield, Victoria, with a locality of Coburg, Victoria, both suburbs of Melbourne, and listing Gladys Lucas as next of kin. Lucas was allotted service number VX26480 and posted to the 2/1st Australian Machine Gun Battalion. He was sent to join his battalion in Palestine, but a bout of appendicitis resulted in him having an operation on his gallbladder on arrival, and so he was not medically fit to join the battalion when it sailed for Greece in early April 1941. He was discharged from the Australian Military Forces on 7 November 1941, with the rank of private. His posting at discharge was Headquarters, Guard Battalion.

Death
Lucas died on 4 November 2008 of natural causes, aged 108, one week before the 90th Anniversary since Armistice day.

References

External links
 BBC Obituary for Syd Lucas

1900 births
2008 deaths
English centenarians
Australian centenarians
Men centenarians
Australian Army personnel of World War II
British Army personnel of World War I
Military personnel from Leicester
Sherwood Foresters soldiers
English emigrants to Australia
Australian Army soldiers
People from Mornington Peninsula
Military personnel from Melbourne